Lake Rotorua is the second largest lake in the North Island of New Zealand by surface area, and covers 79.8 km2. 
With a mean depth of only 10 metres it is considerably smaller than nearby Lake Tarawera in terms of volume of water. It is located within the Rotorua Caldera in the Bay of Plenty Region.

Geography

Lake Rotorua is fed with water from a number of rivers and streams; some such as the Utuhina flow water of a water temperature warmer than the lake due to the thermal activity in the Rotorua area. Conversely streams on the northern shore such as the Hamurana Spring and the Awahou stream flow crystal clear water that has a constant temperature of 10 degrees Celsius. Other notable tributaries include the Ngongotahā stream, famous for trout fishing.

Geology 

The lake was formed from the crater of a large volcano in the Taupo Volcanic Zone.  Its last major eruption was about 240,000 years ago.  After the eruption, the magma chamber underneath the volcano collapsed.  The circular depression left behind is the Rotorua Caldera, which is the site of the lake. Several other lakes of volcanic origin are located nearby to the east, around the base of the active volcano Mount Tarawera.

Mokoia Island, close to the centre of the lake, is a rhyolite dome. It is probably New Zealand's best-known lake island, and is closely associated with one of the best-known Māori legends, that of Hinemoa and Tutanekai. Is said that Hinemoa swam across the lake to her lover Tutanekai who lived on Mokoia Island.

Owing to the geothermal activity around the lake (including still active geysers and hot mud pools), the lake has a high sulphur content. This gives the lake's waters an unusual yellowish-green hue.

Tourist attraction 
Despite the large volume of water flowing through Lake Rotorua its shallow depth  makes it very prone to discolouration, especially from sediment following windy weather. It is well used by fishermen, but less popular with watersports participants and swimmers.

Lake Rotorua flows directly into Lake Rotoiti via the Ohau Channel at the north eastern corner of the lake; this channel is navigable by boat and is also favoured by fly fishermen. The Ohau channel joins at the Mourea delta, an area with very low water levels. This area is frequented by novice kayakers and swimmers. Nearby is the ancestral land of the Ngati Pikiao hapu of the Te Arawa tribe. From Lake Rotoiti the waters of Lake Rotorua flow to the Kaituna River into the Pacific Ocean near Maketu; the rapid descent from over 900 feet above sea level in less than 20 km has created an area used for extreme kayaking and white water rafting.

See also
Lakes of New Zealand
List of lakes in New Zealand

References 

Tourist attractions in Rotorua
Taupō Volcanic Zone
Lakes of the Bay of Plenty Region
Volcanic crater lakes